Huazhou or Hua Prefecture was a zhou (prefecture) in imperial China seated in modern Hua County, Shaanxi, China. It existed (intermittently) from 554 to 1913. Through history it was also known by other names, including Tai Prefecture (685–705, 760–762), Huayin Commandery (742–758) and Dexing Prefecture (897–900).

Counties
Zheng, modern Hua County
Pucheng, modern Pucheng County
Huayin, modern Huayin
Weinan, modern Weinan

References

 
 
 

Prefectures of the Sui dynasty
Prefectures of the Tang dynasty
Yongxingjun Circuit
Prefectures of Later Liang (Five Dynasties)
Prefectures of Later Tang
Prefectures of Later Jin (Five Dynasties)
Prefectures of Later Han (Five Dynasties)
Prefectures of Later Zhou
Prefectures of the Jin dynasty (1115–1234)
Prefectures of the Yuan dynasty
Prefectures of the Ming dynasty
Prefectures of the Qing dynasty
Former prefectures in Shaanxi